Chian Yai is a district (amphoe) in the southeastern part of Nakhon Si Thammarat province, southern Thailand.

Geography
Neighboring districts are (from the north clockwise): Pak Phanang, Hua Sai, Cha-uat, and Chaloem Phra Kiat.

History
The minor district (king amphoe) on 1 February 1937 by splitting it from Pak Phanang district. It was upgraded to a full district on 3 November 1947.

Administration
The district is divided into 10 sub-districts (tambons), which are further subdivided into 98 villages (mubans). Chian Yai is a township (thesaban tambon) which covers parts of tambons Chian Yai, Tha Khanan, and Thong Lamchiak. There are a further nine tambon administrative organizations (TAO).

Missing numbers belong to tambons which now form Chaloem Phra Kiat.

External links
amphoe.com

Districts of Nakhon Si Thammarat province